The 1959 USAC Championship Car season consisted of 13 races, beginning in Daytona Beach, Florida on April 4 and concluding in Sacramento, California on October 25. There were also three non-championship events.  The USAC National Champion and Indianapolis 500 winner was Rodger Ward. In this tragic season 7 fatal accidents occurred. During the pre-season, Marshall Teague was fatally injured in a crash at Daytona. He was 37 years old. In the first race of the season at Daytona, 34-year-old George Amick was killed in an accident on the last lap. In the second race of the season at Trenton,  Dick Linder was killed; he was 36 years old. The third race of the season, the Indy 500, had two fatalities.  On May 2, Jerry Unser (26 years old) was killed in a practice accident, and on May 19 death Bob Cortner (32 years old) was also killed in a practice accident. On July 19 at Mechanicsburg in the Indianapolis Sweepstakes non-championship race Van Johnson was killed in an accident; he was 32 years old. On August 30, 32-year-old Ed Elisian was killed at the Milwaukee Mile. The 1959 season could be considered one of the most tragic seasons in American open-wheel car history.

Schedule and results

 Indianapolis 500 was USAC-sanctioned and counted towards the 1959 FIA World Championship of Drivers title.
 No pole is awarded for the Pikes Peak Hill Climb, in this schedule on the pole is the driver who started first. No lap led was awarded for the Pikes Peak Hill Climb, however, a lap was awarded to the drivers that completed the climb.

Final points standings

Note: At the Milwaukee 200 started with the car #16 Jim Rathmann, after 29 lap the relieved driver A. J. Foyt led the car the remaining 171 lap and finished 4, so the car completed the 200 lap. The points for this place was 240 points, Jim Rathmann received 34.8 points and A. J. Foyt received 205.2 points; because the method: (the points for the finish place) / (number the lap when completed the car) * (number the lap when completed the driver).

References
 
 
 http://media.indycar.com/pdf/2011/IICS_2011_Historical_Record_Book_INT6.pdf  (p. 276-277)

See also
 1959 Indianapolis 500

USAC Championship Car season
USAC Championship Car
1959 in American motorsport